Jelle Duin (born 27 January 1999) is a Dutch professional footballer who plays as forward for Danish Superliga club AGF, on loan from AZ.

Career
Duin played in the youth of Koninklijke HFC, HFC Haarlem and AZ. With the second team of AZ, Jong AZ, Duin became champion of the third-tier Tweede Divisie in the 2016–17 season, which secured promotion to the second-tier, professional Eerste Divisie. He made his debut for Jong AZ in professional football on 22 December 2017, in the home match against NEC. He was in the starting lineup, played the entire match and scored a goal, as Jong AZ lost 2–7.

Duin was sent on a one-season loan deal to FC Volendam on 2 September 2019. He made 14 appearances for the club, in which he scored five goals. On 31 July 2020, Duin was sent on another one-season loan, this time to MVV Maastricht. On 12 December, however, it was announced that Duin was returning to AZ on 1 January 2021 due to lacking perspectives of further development. On 19 August 2022 it was confirmed, that Duin had joined Danish Superliga club AGF on a one-year loan deal with a purchase option.

Honours
Jong AZ
 Tweede Divisie: 2016–17

References

External links
 
 

1999 births
Living people
Dutch footballers
Dutch expatriate footballers
People from Heemstede
Footballers from North Holland
Netherlands youth international footballers
Association football forwards
Koninklijke HFC players
HFC Haarlem players
AZ Alkmaar players
Jong AZ players
FC Volendam players
MVV Maastricht players
Aarhus Gymnastikforening players
Tweede Divisie players
Eerste Divisie players
Danish Superliga players
Dutch expatriate sportspeople in Denmark
Expatriate men's footballers in Denmark